Ó Tó Gẹ́ is the slogan for the political revolution that took place in Nigeria's Kwara State in 2019. The slogan was first used by 79-year-old Lazeez Ayinla Kolawole, a member of the All Progressives Congress.

Ó Tó Gẹ́, which translates to "enough is enough" in English, has been described by election observers as an impactful three-word campaign slogan, effectively used to end decades of political hegemony of Saraki's dynasty in Kwara State.

Before the 2019 election, all elective offices in Kwara State were nominated and won by loyalist of Saraki's dynasty led by Olusola Saraki, who later transferred the mantle of leadership to his son, Bukola Saraki, a former President of Nigeria's Senate.

After years of dominance by the Saraki family, which saw the children of Olusola Saraki holding various elective position at the same time, the people of Kwara State under different organizations, including the All Progressives Congress, voted massively against all loyalists of the dynasty under the umbrella of the People's Democratic Party.

The revolution saw the defeat of Bukola Saraki, who was the incumbent Senate President of Nigeria in 2019.

2019 Nigeria General Election

In the build-up of the 2019 general election, Bukola Saraki, the leader of Saraki Dynasty, decamped from the ruling All Progressives Congress along with the Kwara State Governor, Abdulfatah Ahmed.
Most of those in the opposing People's Democratic Party moved to the All Progressives Congress in a bid to oust members of Saraki's dynasty form elective offices.

After the election held in February and March 2019, members of various elected posts under the All Progressives Congress emerged as winners for various positions. This brought an end to years of the Dynasty's dominance in Kwara State politics.

Notable individuals

Notable in the revolution are:

 AbdulRahman AbdulRazaq
 Kayode Alabi
 Lola Ashiru
 Ibrahim Yahaya Oloriegbe
 Sadiq Umar AbdulGaniyu
 Lai Mohammed
 Shuaib Oba AbdulRaheem
 AbdulGaniyu Cook Olododo
 Shuaib Oba AbdulRaheem
 Simon Ajibola
 Suleiman Ajadi
 Prince Fagbemi
 Akogun Iyiola Oyedepo
 Hakeem Lawal
 Akaje Ibrahim
 Abdulfatai Yahaya Seriki
 Moshood Mustapha
 Lukman Mustapha
 Tunde Ibitoye 
 Femi White
 Modibo Kawu
 Rex Olawoye
 Esirogunjo Musbau
 Gbemisola Saraki
 Femi Ogunsola
 Jerry Majin Kolo
 Dele Aina
 Oyin Zubir
 Saheed Popoola
 Omoniyi Olawale Michael

References

Kwara State